The Nausori Highlands are located in the interior of Fiji's main island Viti Levu. One of the most picturesque villages is Navala. The Nausori Highlands are a great place to learn about Fijian culture.

The dryzone mountain rainforest contributes to its national significance as outlined in Fiji's Biodiversity Strategy and Action Plan.

History
The Nausori Highlands were originally considered a hideout for cannibals. Near a thatched house, the official residence of the chief, lies a cemetery where missionaries converted the highlands to Christianity.

Since the 21st century, the area has been a site of national significance.

References

Further reading
 

Populated places in Fiji
Highlands
Preliminary Register of Sites of National Significance in Fiji